Doctor Radio is a Sirius XM Radio station which broadcasts health & medical information programmed by the NYU Langone Medical Center.  The channel is located on channel 110 on both the XM Satellite Radio service and on the Sirius Satellite Radio service.  This channel started officially on 2008-06-02 Sirius.  The channel was added to XM on 2008-11-12 as part of the merger of channel lineups of Sirius & XM.

In March 2020, Doctor Radio added a temporary extension of their service on Sirius XM channel 121 (the vacated slot for Sirius XM Insight), specifically dealing with information, news, and listener questions regarding the COVID-19 pandemic, which was made available for free to non-subscribers with inactive radios and streaming.

References

External links
 Doctor Radio

XM Satellite Radio channels
Sirius Satellite Radio channels
Sirius XM Radio channels
Radio stations established in 2008